Harmothoe (Ancient Greek Ἁρμοθόη) is a name that may refer to:

In Greek mythology:
Harmothoe (Amazon), attendant warrior of Penthesilea
Harmothoe, wife of Pandareus
Harmothoe, a genus of Polychaete worms